Al-Hai District is a district of the Wasit Governorate, Iraq. Its seat is the city of Al-Hay.

External links
Wasit Province(Arabic)

Districts of Wasit Governorate